Matts (Matti) Poutiainen (7 March 1864 in Sortavalan maalaiskunta – 5 June 1929) was a Finnish farmer and politician. He was a member of the Parliament of Finland from 1908 to 1916, representing the Agrarian League.

References

1864 births
1929 deaths
People from Sortavalsky District
People from Viipuri Province (Grand Duchy of Finland)
Centre Party (Finland) politicians
Members of the Parliament of Finland (1908–09)
Members of the Parliament of Finland (1909–10)
Members of the Parliament of Finland (1910–11)
Members of the Parliament of Finland (1911–13)
Members of the Parliament of Finland (1913–16)